Iberia Sport Club was a Spanish football club based in Zaragoza, Aragon. The club was founded in 1916, and played its games at Estadio Torrero, on 1932 merged with Zaragoza Club Deportivo to form the current Real Zaragoza.

History

Background
Zaragoza FC - (1921–1924) → ↓
Zaragoza FC - (1924–1925)
CD Fuenclara - (1918–1924) → ↑

Zaragoza FC - (1924–1925) → ↓
Zaragoza CD - (1925–1932)
Ath. Stadium - (1919–1924) → ↑

Iberia SC - (1916–1932) → ↓
Real Zaragoza - (1932–)
Zaragoza CD - (1925–1932) → ↑

Seasons

 3 seasons in Segunda División
 1 season in Tercera División

External links
Official website of R. Zaragoza 

Sport in Zaragoza
Real Zaragoza
Association football clubs established in 1916
Association football clubs disestablished in 1932
Defunct football clubs in Aragon
1916 establishments in Spain
1932 disestablishments in Spain
Segunda División clubs